= Fatima El Kettani =

Moroccan psychologist and author

- Born: 1954|02|09; Rabat, Morocco
- Citizenship: Moroccan
- Occupations: Writer and psychologist
- Notable work: His Great Moral with Children, The Game of Married Life.

Fatima El Kettani is a Moroccan psychologist and author. She is known for her work in the field of mental health–including Escaping from Freedom, the game of married life, and His Great Moral with Children– An Analytical Study of Childhood in the Life of the Prophet Muhammad. She appeared in shows on Moroccan and Lebanese TV.

== Published works ==
El Kettani, Fatima (2000). Parental Attitudes in Social Upbringing and Their Relationship with Children's Fears–Master thesis.

El Kettani, Fatima (2004). Social Anxiety and Its Relationship with Aggression in Children–Doctoral dissertation.

El Kettani, Fatima (2011). How to earn your Teenager's Trust.

El Kettani, Fatima (2011). The game of Married Life. Beirut: Arab Scientific publishers.

El Kettani, Fatima (2013). Release the Giant from the Inside of Your Child. Beirut: Arab Scientific publishers. The book is about the early stages of human life and the role of parents in the development of the child.

El Kettani, Fatima (2015). Awaken to see the light within you. Beirut: Arab Scientific publishers..

El Kettani, Fatima (2020). And I Befriended Myself. Beirut: Arab Scientific publishers. .

El Kettani, Fatima (2020). Escaping from Freedom. Beirut: Arab Scientific publishers. and Wake up to see the light that is inside yourself, a 2015 book about the human being as a soul, a body, and a self that is composed of two selves.

Psychological Toxins (2021) is about negative thoughts and feelings.
